James A. Dick V (born February 5, 1989) is an American professional stock car racing driver. A veteran of the NASCAR Camping World West Series, he last competed in the NASCAR Xfinity Series on a part-time basis, driving the No. 55 Chevrolet for Viva Motorsports.

Racing career
Dick began his racing career at the age of nine, competing in kart racing events, before soon moving up to Legends car racing, and then late model competition, including competing in the SRL Southwest Tour. In 2007, at the age of 18, he moved up to the NASCAR West Series - renamed Camping World West Series the following year - scoring eight top 10 and one top 5 finishes over the next two years of competition.

In 2009, Dick made his debut in the NASCAR Camping World Truck Series at Iowa Speedway; he ran a limited schedule in the series over the next two years, scoring a best finish of 16th at Iowa Speedway in 2010.

In 2011, Dick moved up to the NASCAR Nationwide Series, making his first start in the series at Kentucky Speedway in the family-owned and family-sponsored No. 02 Chevrolet. He finished 30th in his inaugural event. He made two more starts in the series in 2011, with the race at Kentucky being his best finish of the year.

For 2012, Dick is competing in 14 Nationwide Series, driving the No. 23 Chevrolet in a collaborative effort between the family team, Viva Motorsports, Corrie Stott Racing and R3 Motorsports, with sponsorship from Viva Auto Group, a chain of auto dealerships owned by his father in the El Paso, Texas area. In June, Dick scored a career best 21st-place finish at Dover International Speedway, then finished 19th at Kentucky Speedway in September and 18th at Phoenix International Raceway in November.

In February 2013, Dick announced that he would be running the full 2013 NASCAR Nationwide Series season with his family team, VIVA Motorsports, however he was forced to cut back on his schedule due to a lack of sponsorship.

In 2015, after the Axalta Faster. Tougher. Brighter. 200 at Phoenix International Raceway, Dick was reporting signs of dizziness and fatigue, and upon a visit to the infield care center, he was diagnosed with onset diabetes.

Personal life
Born in El Paso, Texas in 1989, Dick moved to Albuquerque, New Mexico at an early age. He is the son of racer and businessman Jimmy Dick, and is a graduate of the University of Denver. 

After his racing career, Dick joined his father's car dealership business, serving as branch principal for multiple dealerships.

Motorsports career results

NASCAR
(key) (Bold – Pole position awarded by qualifying time. Italics – Pole position earned by points standings or practice time. * – Most laps led.)

Xfinity Series

Camping World Truck Series

K&N Pro Series West

 Season still in progress
 Ineligible for series points

See also 
 List of sportspeople with diabetes

References

External links 

 

Living people
1989 births
Racing drivers from Texas
Sportspeople from El Paso, Texas
NASCAR drivers
University of Denver alumni
Racing drivers from Albuquerque, New Mexico